Isalean Philip is a Saint Kitts and Nevis politician from the Saint Kitts and Nevis Labour Party. She was appointed Junior Minister in the Ministry of Social Development, Youth Empowerment, Gender Affairs, Aging and Disabilities in the Drew ministry in August 2022.

References 

Year of birth missing (living people)
Living people
Women government ministers of Saint Kitts and Nevis
Members of the National Assembly (Saint Kitts and Nevis)
21st-century women politicians
Saint Kitts and Nevis Labour Party politicians
Saint Kitts and Nevis women in politics

Saint Mary's University (Halifax) alumni